Young Justice is an American animated television series created by Greg Weisman and Brandon Vietti for Cartoon Network. The series follows the lives of teenaged heroes who are members of a covert operations team that takes orders from the Justice League. The series debuted on January 7, 2011, with a two-week reairing of the first two episodes, which originally aired as an hour-long special on November 26, 2010. Warner Bros. Animation announced the show's return in November 2016 after an extended hiatus since 2013; new episodes were released in 2019.

Series overview

Episode list

Season 1 (2010–12)

Season 2: Invasion (2012–13)

Season 3: Outsiders (2019)

The first letter of each episode spells out a hidden phrase: "Prepare the Anti-Life Equation".

Season 4: Phantoms (2021–22)

The first letter of each episode spells out a hidden phrase: "Invitation to Kneel Before Zod".

References

Lists of American children's animated television series episodes
Lists of DC Nation television series episodes
Young Justice (TV series)